Louisiana Highway 31 (LA 31) is a  north–south state highway in Louisiana that serves Iberia, St. Martin, and St. Landry parishes, extending from LA 182 in New Iberia, and ending at the same highway in Opelousas.

Route description
From the south, LA 31 begins at a junction with LA 182 in New Iberia.  After a short distance, the route begins to travel along the west bank of Bayou Teche.  LA 31 crosses from Iberia Parish into St. Martin Parish near a junction with LA 86.  Passing through the historic town of St. Martinville, LA 31 briefly overlaps LA 96.  Continuing northward, LA 31 makes a jog in the tiny community of Parks and follows a western bend in Bayou Teche.  In the town of Breaux Bridge, LA 31 makes another jog and crosses LA 94.  At the north end of town, the highway crosses but does intersect I-10, the main highway across southern Louisiana.  Access to the interstate is instead provided by LA 328 on the opposite bank of Bayou Teche.

LA 31 continues to meander along several bends in the bayou, passing opposite Cecilia en route to Arnaudville.  Here, the highway intersects the eastern terminus of LA 93, connecting with nearby I-49.  Immediately afterward, LA 31 switches to the opposite bank of Bayou Teche and proceeds northwest to Leonville, where it intersects LA 103.  A few miles later, LA 31 leaves the path of Bayou Teche and eventually comes to a T-intersection with LA 742.  The highway turns due west, enters the city limits of Opelousas, and passes through a diamond interchange with I-49.  LA 31 proceeds on Creswell Lane a short distance further to its junction with LA 182 a few blocks south of the downtown area.

Major intersections

References

0031
Transportation in Iberia Parish, Louisiana
Transportation in St. Martin Parish, Louisiana
Transportation in St. Landry Parish, Louisiana